Karyn Rachtman is an American music supervisor and film producer. One of the "most influential music supervisors of all time,"  she has music supervised and/or served as the executive soundtrack producer on albums that have sold over 75 million copies worldwide.

With Pras Michael and Ben Patterson, Rachtman produced the 2015 film Sweet Micky for President, a documentary about Michel Martelly's path to the Haitian presidency. She executive produced Archie's Final Project, a film about a teenage student who decides to kill himself on-camera as his final high school project, and created the children's "read and rap-along" book series Hip Kid Hop.

Early life
Karyn Rachtman was born in Los Angeles, California, to Peter Rachtman, a music manager, and Sheila Watson, an educator. Her parents divorced when she was a child, and she and her brother Riki lived mainly with their mother. Growing up, she was "obsessed" with music, and would go to her father's house on weekends and listen to his records. Rachtman was first exposed to the film industry through the actress Karen Black, who her father dated in the 1970s.

At 15, Rachtman—a "wayward" teenager—was sent to live with her father, who had moved to New Zealand.  She dropped out of high school, and remained in New Zealand for a year. 
 She attended cosmetology school when she returned to Los Angeles.

Career

Cannon Films,Texasville, Reservoir Dogs
Rachtman moved to New York in 1982.  She worked at a clothing store, where she met Paula Erickson, then the head of music for Cannon Films in LA. Learning that Erickson  "got paid to put cool old songs in movies," she begged to be her assistant, and moved back to Los Angeles.  At Cannon, Rachtman learned how to prepare cue sheets, clear music, and negotiate music rights, and worked on films including Rappin' and Texas Chainsaw Massacre 2. She left Cannon to work as a plugger for Island Music,  and then cleared music for established music supervisors, working independently.  In 1990, she was hired by Peter Bogdanovich to music supervise Texasville, and received her first credit as a  music supervisor on a major film.  She founded her company, Mind Your Music, later that year.

In 1992, producer Stacey Sher introduced Rachtman to Quentin Tarantino, who was working on his feature-length debut, Reservoir Dogs. He was determined to use the Stealers Wheel song  "Stuck in the Middle With You" for a pivotal scene, and the music supervisor on the film had been unable to secure the necessary rights.  After a complicated negotiation, Rachtman acquired the song, and Tarantino hired her as the music supervisor for Reservoir Dogs. Rachtman brought the soundtrack album to MCA, and the resulting record deal paid for the music that was ultimately used in the film.  The music used in Reservoir Dogs—particularly "Stuck in the Middle with You" --  "would change cinema thereafter."

Reality Bites, Pulp Fiction, Clueless, Capitol and Interscope Records
In 1994, Rachtman worked on 15 films, including two, simultaneously:  Reality Bites, with director Ben Stiller, and Pulp Fiction  with Tarantino. The Reality Bites soundtrack was one of the biggest records of the year; its lead single, Lisa Loeb's "Stay (I Missed You)," was the first song by an independent artist to hit #1 on the Billboard Pop Charts. The use of music in Pulp Fiction was  a "milestone in creative music supervision"  that "dramatically changed how most movie producers thought about the music that accompanied their films."  The Pulp Fiction soundtrack has sold four million copies since its release.

By the end of the 1990s, Rachtman had music supervised or executive produced soundtracks for Clueless, Get Shorty,  The Basketball Diaries, Romeo + Juliet, Grace of My Heart, Boogie Nights, Bulworth and The Rugrats Movie,  among others. She had worked closely with Amy Heckerling, Baz Luhrmann, Paul Thomas Anderson, Warren Beatty, Allison Anders and Robert Rodriguez, and become one of the most sought-after music supervisors in the film industry.

In the mid-1990s, as the relationship between the film and music industries became more synergistic, the role of the music supervisor "became far more important as the potential economic benefits of soundtrack albums continued to grow," and Rachtman was pursued both by filmmakers and record companies. In 1994, she was named vice president of soundtracks and A&R for Capitol Records, and in 1997—engineered in part by Beatty—she was appointed head of soundtracks  for Interscope Records.
 At Interscope, she music supervised and/or executive soundtrack produced Moulin Rouge!, Office Space, the Rugrats Movie, Bulworth, and Mystery Men. She was also given her own imprint,  Gazillion Records. After leaving Interscope,  Rachtman once again worked independently, subsequently music supervising films including Laurel Canyon, North Country, Holes and the SpongeBob SquarePants Movie.

Hip Kid Hop,  Archie's Final Project,  Sweet Micky for President, Mind Your Music NZ LTD
In 2002, Rachtman went to Scholastic with an idea for a series of children's picture books called Hip Kid Hop. Inspired by the read-along books of her childhood, as well as the similarities between hip-hop's language and the language of books for children,  Hip Kid Hop was geared toward readers aged 4–10.  The first books in the series, by LL Cool J and Doug E. Fresh, were "morality tales and stories about developing personal strength." Each book came with a read-along CD.

She music supervised and executive produced Archie's Final Project (originally released as My Suicide) in 2009, a dark comedy about a teenager who becomes the most popular kid in his high school when he announces he is going to kill himself on camera for his final video class project. The film won the 2009 Best Feature at the Berlin Film Festival, in addition to other awards. She  produced Sweet Mickey for President with Pras Michael, who she first met while working on Bulworth. She began the project as an executive producer, and became a producer as she got more involved in the hands-on production of the film. A documentary about Michael Martely, a colorful musician who ran for president of Haiti in the wake of the 2010 earthquake that devastated the country, it was a selection for film festivals including  the Los Angeles Film Festival and the Slamdance Film Festival where it won the juried award for Best Documentary as well as the audience award.

Rachtman began to split her time between New Zealand and Los Angeles in 2016. In addition to the US-based Mind Your Music, she is the founder and CEO of Mind Your Music NZ LTD, a resource for filmmakers, advertisers, and brands to assist with spotting, pre-recording, on camera performances, composer selection/negotiation, song creation and selection, licensing, marketing tie-ins, and soundtrack release.

Personal life
Rachtman lives in Los Angeles and Waiheke Island, near Auckland.  She was married to film producer Lloyd Levin.  She has two sons, Otis and Arlo.

Filmography

References

External links
 Mind Your Music
 

1964 births
Living people
People from Los Angeles
American film producers
American music people
New Zealand music people